Nanded South Assembly constituency is one of the 288 Vidhan Sabha (legislative assembly) constituencies of Maharashtra state, western India. This constituency is located in Nanded district.

Geographical Scope
The delimitation of the constituency happened in 2008. It comprises parts of Loha taluka, the revenue circle of Sonkhed, parts of Nanded taluka, the revenue circle of Tuppa, Vishnupuri and the following wards of Nanded-Waghala Municipal Corporation: 10 to 27, 40 to 49, 59 to 65.

Representative 
 1999: Prakash Khedkar, Shivsena
 2004: Anusaya Khedkar, Shivsena
 2009: Omprakash Pokarna, INC
 2014: Hemant Sriram Patil, Shivsena
 2019: Mohanrao Marotrao Hambarde, INC
Current member of Maharashtra assembly from this constituency is Mohanrao Marotrao Hambarde of Indian National Congress, who defeated Shivsena's Rajashri Hemant Patil & Dilip Kandkurte, Independent by margin of 3500 votes in 2019 Maharashtra Legislative Assembly election.

General elections, 2019

References

Assembly constituencies of Maharashtra
Politics of Nanded district